A herd is a large group of animals.  

Herd may also refer to:

Zoology

 Bachelor herd, gatherings of juvenile male animals who are still sexually immature
 Herding, the act of bringing individual animals together into a group
 Herding dog, dog that either has been trained in herding or that is a member of a breed developed for herding

Psychology

 Crowd control, herding of people
 Herd behavior, situations in which a group of individuals react coherently without there being any co-ordination between them
 Herding instinct, social tendency in humans to identify with and model many behaviors and beliefs after a larger group of individuals with whom they identify
 Sheepdog trial, competitive sport involving dogs working herds of sheep

Other uses
 Herd (surname)
 Herd (film), 2016 Serbian film
 Herd, a short film directed by Mike Mitchell
 "Herd", a nickname of the Buffalo Bisons baseball team
 Wisconsin Herd, an NBA G League team

See also
 The Herd (disambiguation)
 Herding cats (disambiguation)
 GNU Hurd an operating system kernel whose name is a pun on "herd"
 Marshall Thundering Herd, the athletic program of Marshall University, often called "The Herd" by its supporters
 Hird (disambiguation)
 Hurd (disambiguation)
 Heard (disambiguation)